Chen Chun-ching (born 13 November 1975) is a Taiwanese judoka. He competed in the men's half-middleweight event at the 2000 Summer Olympics.

References

1975 births
Living people
Taiwanese male judoka
Olympic judoka of Taiwan
Judoka at the 2000 Summer Olympics
Place of birth missing (living people)